Alpı (also, Alpy) is a village and municipality in the Ujar Rayon of Azerbaijan.  It has a population of 1,215.

References 

Populated places in Ujar District